Jason P. Lorber is a consultant, comedian and politician from Burlington, Vermont. A Democrat, he served in the Vermont House of Representatives from 2005 to 2013, representing the Chittenden-3-3 district in Burlington. He was first elected in November 2004 and did not seek re-election in 2012.

Born in Philadelphia, Pennsylvania, Lorber graduated from the University of California, Berkeley with a BA and earned an MBA from Stanford University. He founded a small business called Aplomb Consulting which works with nonprofit organizations and healthcare clinics, providing strategic planning, fundraising, and other support services. He is also a standup comedian, doing gigs, producing comedy shows and running improv workshops.

First elected to the legislature in November 2004, he was re-elected in 2006, 2008 and 2010. He served on the House Institutions & Corrections Committee, and focussed much of his legislative effort on prison reform. He hosts a television program called "Correcting Corrections" broadcast on CCTV Channel 17.

Lorber is openly gay; his partner is Nathaniel G. Lew, an assistant professor at Saint Michael's College. Lorber and Lew are joined in a civil union.

References

External links
Professional website

1966 births
Living people
Gay politicians
LGBT state legislators in Vermont
Democratic Party members of the Vermont House of Representatives
Politicians from Burlington, Vermont
Stanford Graduate School of Business alumni
University of California, Berkeley alumni
Politicians from Philadelphia